Dimos Gkaitatzis (born 29 June 1992) is a Greek professional footballer.
He has been training for a long time with several teams with which he never came to an agreement. The manager Andrey Shaye sent him after his first steps in the Apollon Kalamarias FC and later met Efthimiadi with whom agreed to join the roster of the second team of Doxa Dramas. Gkaitatzis has scored excellent goals in friendly games which have shown his talent. One of the most important players in his class with speed and versatility.

References

Sources 
 Sport24.gr 
 New-Soccer Official 
 Us.Soccerway.com 
 Dramagoal.gr

External links

1992 births
Living people
Association football forwards
Doxa Drama F.C. players
Greek footballers
Serie D players
Footballers from Thessaloniki
Thermaikos F.C. players